American singer, songwriter, and actress Ariana Grande has appeared in 56 music videos, including eight featured appearances and six uncredited appearances. She has also appeared in 23 television shows and seven films.

Music videos

As lead artist

As featured artist

Guest appearances

Filmography

Television

Film

Web series

Concert tours and other performances

References

External links

Videographies of American artists
Actress filmographies
Videography
American filmographies